Atlantis is the eleventh studio album by Norwegian hard rock band TNT. It was released on 22 September 2008.

Track listing
"Hello, Hello" (Ronni Le Tekro, Tony Mills, Erland Hvalby) - 4:03
"Peter Sellers Blues" - 4:45
"Baby's Got Rhythm" - 3:39
"Tango Girl"(Tekro) - 4:08
"Me and Dad" - 7:52
"Atlantis" - 4:09
"The Taste of Honey" (Mills, Tekro, Persen) - 3:42
"Bottle of Wine" - 3:17
"The Missing Kind" - 4:07
"Love of My Life" - 3:14
"Had it, Lost it, Found it" - 4:55

Bonus tracks
"June" (live in 2007 - bonus track on Japanese edition)
"Substitute" (live in 2007 - bonus track on European edition)

Band/Personnel
Tony Mills – lead and harmony vocals
Ronni Le Tekrø – guitars, backing vocals, sitar on "Baby's Got Rhythm"
Victor Borge – bass guitar, backing vocals
Diesel Dahl – drums and percussion

Additional personnel
 Mari Persen - violin and violin arrangements on 7
 Markus Klyve - keyboards on 4, 7, 9
 Tony Caputo - organ on 3
 Jon Johannessen - additional twang guitar on 3
 Heidi Ruud, Renate Helland - additional backing vocals on 8
 HP-Gundersen - slide and additional backing vocals on 4, piano on 3, 11
 Erland Hvalby - synthesizer on 1, castanets on 4
 Dag Stokke – keyboards
 Tommy Hansen – mixing

Reception
The album was much more well received than The New Territory, with many Norwegian outlets giving it 5 or 6 out of 6, European metal review site Hard Rock Haven giving it 8.1/10. However, Melodic Rock gave it a significantly less enthusiastic review of 69%, though the reviewer did state it was better than The New Territory. German newspaper reviews have been detracting.

References

2008 albums
TNT (Norwegian band) albums